The development of music in the Aosta Valley region of Italy reflects the multilingual make-up of the region including French, Valdôtain and recently Italian.

History 
Similarly to nearby Piedmont and nearby Alpine French-speaking regions (Savoy and Valais), music has much to do with the presence of medieval monasteries that preserved important musical manuscripts from the Middle Ages and also served as conduits of information and influence from areas to the north.

Folk artists 
The main modern singers and songwriters in Aosta Valley are:
Naïf Hérin, from Quart;
Louis de Jyaryot, from Ayas;
Maura Susanna, from Saint-Vincent;
Magui Bétemps, from Valtournenche.

The traditional Aostan songs in Valdôtain and in French form the core of the activity of the band Trouveur valdotèn.

Village bands 
The tradition of village bands is widely developed in the Valley for all age ranges. All bands gather once a year in Aosta during an event organized by the Federation des harmonies valdôtaines.

Regional Symphony Orchestra 
The city of Aosta is the home of a Youth Symphony and, since 1999, the Orchestre d'harmonie du Val d'Aoste, who regularly gives among others a New Year's concert (Concert du nouvel an) in Pont-Saint-Martin.

Events 
The main musical events in the Aosta Valley are:
 Aosta Classica: in the Aostan Roman Theatre
 Châteaux en musique: in the castles in Gressoney-Saint-Jean, Issogne, Saint-Pierre, Sarre and Verrès
 Étoiles et musique

As well, Aosta hosts an International Festival of Chamber Music and an interesting Silent Film Festival with live musical accompaniment.

References

External links
Châteaux en musique
Étoiles et musique
 Istituto musicale della Valle d’Aosta - Conservatoire de la Vallée d'Aoste
 Aosta classica

Aosta Valley
Aosta Valley